Frank Willem Jan Hekking (1964 — died 15 May 2017) was a Dutch physicist working at Université Grenoble Alpes in Grenoble, France. He is notable for his contributions in theory of mesoscopic superconductivity, in particular, Andreev reflection and Josephson effect. He was a member of Institut Universitaire de France since 2012 until his death.

After postdoctoral appointments at the University of Karlsruhe, the University of Minnesota, the University of Cambridge, and Ruhr University Bochum, he became a professor at Université Grenoble Alpes. He was attached to Laboratoire de Physique et de Modélisation des Milieux Condensés of CNRS, and he was a director of this laboratory on two occasions.

References

1964 births
2017 deaths
21st-century Dutch physicists
Academic staff of Grenoble Alpes University
Delft University of Technology alumni
Dutch expatriates in France
Condensed matter physicists